Multyfarnham is a civil parish in County Westmeath, Ireland.

Multyfarnham is one of 8 civil parishes in the barony of Corkaree in the Province of Leinster.

Multyfarnham civil parish comprises the village of Multyfarnham, and 14 townlands: Abbeyland, Ballindurrow, Ballinphort, Ballinriddera, Ballynaclonagh, Ballynakill, Donore, Froghanstown, Lismalady, Monintown, the townland of Multyfarnham, Rathganny, Soho and Tober.

The neighbouring civil parishes are: Mayne (barony of Fore) to the north, Faughalstown (Fore) to the north and east, Leny, Stonehall and Tyfarnham to the south and Lackan to the west.

See also

Multyfarnham

References

External links
Multyfarnham civil parish at the IreAtlas Townland Data Base
Multyfarnham civil parish at Townlands.ie
Multyfarnham civil parish at Logainm.ie

Civil parishes of County Westmeath